Duet Selimova-Želčeski, was a Macedonian folk music duo, consisted of married couple Kevser "Keti" Selimova and Đorđe Želčeski. The duo were one of the best known musical groups of Macedonia, and they were also well known in the other former Yugoslav republics.

Selimova is Macedonian Turkish from Resen, while Želčeski was Macedonian from Prilep. Selimova currently lives in Belgrade while Želčeski died in February 2020.

References

http://www.politika.rs/rubrike/Magazin/U-novom-broju-Magazina-u-nedelju-23-decembra-citajte.lt.html
http://www.discogs.com/artist/Duet+Selimova+-+%C5%BDel%C4%8Deski

Macedonian folk singers
Yugoslav musical groups
Musical duos
Macedonian musical groups